Electoral district no. 10 is one of the 12 multi-member electoral districts of the Riigikogu, the national legislature of Estonia. The district was established as electoral district no. 9 in 1995 following the re-organisation of electoral districts. It was renamed electoral district no. 10 in 2003 following another re-organisation of electoral districts. It is conterminous with the municipality of Tartu. The district currently elects eight of the 101 members of the Riigikogu using the open party-list proportional representation electoral system. At the 2019 parliamentary election it had 67,525 registered electors.

Electoral system
Electoral district no. 10 currently elects eight of the 101 members of the Riigikogu using the open party-list proportional representation electoral system. The allocation of seats is carried out in three stages. In the first stage, any individual candidate, regardless of whether they are a party or independent candidate, who receives more votes than the district's simple quota (Hare quota: valid votes in district/number of seats allocated to district) is elected via a personal mandate. In the second stage, district mandates are allocated to parties by dividing their district votes by the district's simple quota. Only parties that reach the 5% national threshold compete for district mandates and any personal mandates won by the party are subtracted from the party's district mandates. Prior to 2003 if a party's surplus/remainder votes was equal to or greater than 75% of the district's simple quota it received one additional district mandate. Any unallocated district seats are added to a national pool of compensatory seats. In the final stage, compensatory mandates are calculated based on the national vote and using a modified D'Hondt method. Only parties that reach the 5% national threshold compete for compensatory seats and any personal and district mandates won by the party are subtracted from the party's compensatory mandates. Though calculated nationally, compensatory mandates are allocated at the district level.

Seats
Seats allocated to electoral district no. 10 by the National Electoral Committee of Estonia at each election was as follows:
 2023 - 8
 2019 - 8
 2015 - 8
 2011 - 8
 2007 - 8
 2003 - 8
 1999 - 8
 1995 - 9

Election results

Summary

(Excludes compensatory seats)

Detailed

2023
Results of the 2023 parliamentary election held on 5 March 2023:

The following candidates were elected:
 Personal mandates - Urmas Klaas (REF), 8,065 votes.
 District mandates -  Yoko Alender (REF), 2,051 votes; Kristina Kallas (EE200), 4,288 votes; Ants Laaneots (REF), 1,869 votes; Heljo Pikhof (SDE), 1,242 votes; and Jaak Valge (EKRE), 2,340 votes.
 Compensatory mandates - Signe Kivi (REF), 1,286 votes; and Tõnis Lukas (IE), 2,218 votes.

2019
Results of the 2019 parliamentary election held on 3 March 2019:

The following candidates were elected:
 Personal mandates - Urmas Klaas (RE), 6,119 votes.
 District mandates - Signe Kivi (RE), 1,356 votes; Ants Laaneots (RE), 3,053 votes; Tõnis Lukas (I), 2,506 votes; Aadu Must (K), 2,370 votes; Heljo Pikhof (SDE), 1,522 votes; and Jaak Valge (EKRE), 2,740 votes.
 Compensatory mandates - Ruuben Kaalep (EKRE), 566 votes.

2015
Results of the 2015 parliamentary election held on 1 March 2015:

The following candidates were elected:
 Personal mandates - Ants Laaneots (RE), 5,920 votes.
 District mandates - Krista Aru (EVA), 2,529 votes; Aadu Must (K), 2,139 votes; Mihkel Raud (SDE), 3,229 votes; Anne Sulling (RE), 4,197 votes; and Margus Tsahkna (IRL), 2,267 votes.
 Compensatory mandates - Jüri Adams (EVA), 720 votes; Urmas Klaas (RE), 1,501 votes; and Heljo Pikhof (SDE), 2,042 votes.

2011
Results of the 2011 parliamentary election held on 6 March 2011:

The following candidates were elected:
 Personal mandates - Urmas Kruuse (RE), 6,824 votes.
 District mandates - Laine Jänes (RE), 2,211 votes; Tõnis Lukas (IRL), 4,807 votes; Rait Maruste (RE), 2,425 votes; Aadu Must (K), 1,901 votes; Heljo Pikhof (SDE), 3,270 votes; and Margus Tsahkna (IRL), 3,228 votes.

2007
Results of the 2007 parliamentary election held on 4 March 2007:

The following candidates were elected:
 Personal mandates - Laine Jänes (RE), 9,303 votes.
 District mandates - Hannes Astok (RE), 1,465 votes; Tõnis Lukas (IRL), 3,979 votes; Silver Meikar (RE), 902 votes; Aadu Must (K), 2,088 votes; and Heljo Pikhof (SDE), 3,270 votes.
 Compensatory mandates - Karel Rüütli (ERL), 558 votes; Toomas Trapido (EER), 1,691 votes; and Peeter Tulviste (IRL), 2,424 votes.

2003
Results of the 2003 parliamentary election held on 2 March 2003:

The following candidates were elected:
 Personal mandates - Andrus Ansip (RE), 7,177 votes.
 District mandates - Margus Hanson (RE), 1,082 votes; Teet Jagomägi (ÜVE-RP), 3,753 votes; Urmo Kööbi (ÜVE-RP), 1,558 votes; Tõnis Lukas (I), 2,120 votes; Sven Mikser (K), 1,327 votes; 
 Compensatory mandates - Ene Ergma (ÜVE-RP), 979 votes; and Peeter Tulviste (I), 1,572 votes.

1999
Results of the 1999 parliamentary election held on 7 March 1999:

The following candidates were elected:
 Personal mandates - Tõnis Lukas (I), 5,667 votes; and Toomas Savi (RE), 6,535 votes.
 District mandates - Jüri Adams (I), 1,914 votes; Andrus Ansip (RE), 898 votes; Tõnu Kauba (K), 1,244 voets; Marju Lauristin (M), 3,585 votes.
 Compensatory mandates - Jaan Leppik (I), 912 votes; Mihkel Pärnoja (M), 237 votes; and Olev Raju (K), 899 votes.

1995
Results of the 1995 parliamentary election held on 5 March 1995:

The following candidates were elected:
 Personal mandates - Toomas Savi (RE), 6,306 votes.
 District mandates - Rein Järlik (KMÜ), 3,970 votes; and Tõnis Lukas (I\ERSP), 3,147 votes.
 Compensatory mandates - Sergei Issakov (MKOE), 619 votes; Tõnu Kõrda (K), 470 votes; Mati Meos (KMÜ), 436 votes; Aap Neljas (RE), 496 votes; Mihkel Pärnoja (M), 389 votes; Valentin Strukov (MKOE), 1,188 votes; Enn Tarto (P), 2,814 votes; Lauri Vahtre (I\ERSP), 1,743 votes; and Andra Veidemann (K), 1,481 votes.

References

10
10
Riigikogu electoral district